Brave Hearts may refer to:

Brave Hearts: Umizaru, a 2012 Japanese film
Cœurs Vaillants ("Brave Hearts"), a 1929–1981 French language newspaper

See also
Braveheart (disambiguation)